Steg is a village in Liechtenstein, located in the municipality of Triesenberg.

Sports
Liechtenstein's only ski jumping hill was situated here.
Steg is a popular destination for multi-sport.

Gallery

References

External links

Villages of Liechtenstein